Tanner Joseph Lee (born February 14, 1995) is a former American football quarterback. He played college football at Nebraska and Tulane.

Early years
Lee was born in New Orleans, Louisiana and was raised in Destrehan, Louisiana. He attended Jesuit High School, where he played both football and baseball for the Blue Jays. In his career, he led the Blue Jays football to a 30–8 record while passing for 3984 yards, 39 touchdowns, and nine interceptions.

College career

2014 season 
Lee redshirted as a freshman at Tulane in 2013. In 2014, he became the starter. On August 28, 2014, Lee recorded 262 yards and three touchdowns in his college debut against Tulsa. On September 13, he tossed three touchdowns and recorded 238 yards against Southeastern Louisiana. On November 8, he gained 237 yards and scored three times against Houston. Lee started all 10 of his games, throwing for 1,962 yards and 12 touchdowns which set Tulane freshman records.

2015 season 
On September 3, 2015, Lee recorded 246 yards and a touchdown in the season opener against Duke. On September 19, he recorded a season-high 277 yards and a touchdown against Maine. On October 3, Lee threw a career-high four touchdowns against UCF. On November 14, he recorded 252 yards and two touchdowns against Army. He started all 9 of his games in 2015, throwing for 1,639 yards, 11 touchdowns, and seven interceptions.

2017  season 
On January 30, 2016, Lee announced that he was transferring to the University of Nebraska-Lincoln. He sat out the 2016 season per NCAA transfer rules. On April 19, 2017, Lee was named the starting quarterback for the 2017 season. On September 2, 2017, Lee recorded 238 yards and two touchdowns in the season-opener against Arkansas State. The next week, he threw a season-high three touchdowns against Oregon. On September 16, Lee ran in two scores against Northern Illinois, the first time ever doing so in college. On September 29, he threw three touchdowns against Illinois. On October 14, Lee recorded 303 yards and two touchdowns against Ohio State. On November 28, he threw two touchdowns and gained a career-high 431 yards against Purdue. On November 18, Lee recorded 399 yards and three touchdowns against Penn State. Lee finished his 2017 season recording 3,143 yards, 23 touchdowns, 16 interceptions, two rushing scores, and compiling a 4–8 record as Nebraska's starter.

On December 28, 2017, Lee announced that he would enter the 2018 NFL Draft.

College statistics

Professional career

Lee was drafted by the Jacksonville Jaguars in the sixth round (203rd overall) of the 2018 NFL Draft. On May 10, he signed his rookie contract. He was waived on September 1, 2018 and was signed to the practice squad the next day. He was promoted to the active roster on December 28, 2018.

On August 17, 2019, Lee was waived by the Jaguars.

References

External links
Jacksonville Jaguars bio
 Tulane Green Wave bio
 Nebraska Cornhuskers bio
 Recruitment, Signing, & Career at Tulane and beyond

1995 births
Living people
People from Destrehan, Louisiana
Players of American football from Louisiana
American football quarterbacks
Tulane Green Wave football players
Nebraska Cornhuskers football players
Jacksonville Jaguars players